The Ministry for Culture and Heritage  (MCH) is the department of the New Zealand Government responsible for supporting the arts, culture, built heritage, sport and recreation, and broadcasting sectors in New Zealand and advising government on such.

History
The Ministry of Cultural Affairs had been created in 1991; prior to this, the Department of Internal Affairs (DIA) had provided oversight and support for arts and culture functions.

MCH was founded in 1999 with the merger of the former Ministry of Cultural Affairs and the history and heritage functions of the DIA, as well as some functions from the Department of Conservation and Ministry of Commerce. The purpose of the merger of functions and departments was to create a coherent, non-fragmented overview of the cultural and heritage sector, rather than spreading services and functions across several departments.

Minister for Cultural Affairs Marie Hasler oversaw the transition of functions into the new agency. Opposition Labour MP Judith Tizard, who would later serve as an Associate Minister for the ministry in the Fifth Labour Government of New Zealand, accused the restructure of being "all hype, no substance," lacking the funding and human resource necessary to be effective.

At the time of its establishment, the minister responsible for the ministry was the Minister for Culture and Heritage. This position is now titled the Minister for Arts, Culture and Heritage.

Functions 
The ministry advises the government on policies and issues relating to the arts, culture, heritage, sport and recreation, and broadcasting sectors. It funds 17 other agencies which also support these sectors, looks after war monuments and memorials and war graves throughout New Zealand, and is involved in a number of projects promoting and documenting New Zealand history.

Agencies
 Creative New Zealand (Arts Council of New Zealand)
 New Zealand Music Commission
 New Zealand Symphony Orchestra
 Royal New Zealand Ballet
 Te Matatini Society Inc.
 Broadcasting Standards Authority
 New Zealand Film Commission
NZ on Air
 Radio New Zealand International
 Antarctic Heritage Trust
 Heritage New Zealand
 Museum of New Zealand Te Papa Tongarewa (Te Papa)
 Ngā Taonga Sound & Vision
 Pukaki Trust
 Te Māori Manaaki Taonga Trust
 Drug Free Sport New Zealand
 Sport New Zealand (Sport NZ)

Guardianship
In 2014 the ministry became the guardian of the TVNZ Archive collection on behalf of the crown. It appointed Ngā Taonga Sound & Vision as the initial archive manager. The TVNZ Archive collection contains over 600,000 hours of television spanning almost 55 years of New Zealand's public television history. It includes iconic New Zealand content such as documentaries, dramas, sports programmes and every TVNZ news broadcast from December 1986 to 2014. In a 2014 briefing to Minister Craig Foss, the ministry noted that the long-term preservation of the TVNZ Archive collection did not align with the broadcaster's business needs and that transferring the collection to the crown would allow for the proper preservation of the collection. Both the ministry and TVNZ explicitly wanted to ensure the archive was preserved and that it was made increasingly available for re-use through online streaming and other means.

History and heritage
The ministry supports research into and promotion of New Zealand history. This includes publication of New Zealand history books and e-books, and a number of websites. The ministry's managed sites include:

 New Zealand History Online (NZHistory) 
 Te Ara: The Encyclopedia of New Zealand
 The Dictionary of New Zealand Biography (DNZB)
 Ngā Tapuwae Trails
 WW100, New Zealand's official First World War centenary programme
 Landmarks Whenua Tohunga

David Green, a historian working for the ministry, discovered that significantly more New Zealand personnel were engaged in the Gallipoli Campaign than had been recorded in Fred Waite's official history, The New Zealanders at Gallipoli. Waite's number of some 8,500 men was corrected to approximately 18,000 in September 2013.

Tohu Whenua Landmarks that tell our stories is a partnership between MCH, the Department of Conservation Te Papa Atawhai, Heritage New Zealand Pouhere Taonga and the Ministry of Business, Innovation and Employment. The programme promotes and encourages people to visit New Zealand's historically and culturally important places. Landmarks has been launched so far in Northland and Otago.

Legislation
The ministry is also responsible for overseeing dozens of current acts and regulations. These include:

 Administering the following Orders in Council:
  Canterbury Earthquake (Historic Places Act) Order 2011
 Television New Zealand (Separation of Transmission Business) Order 2003
Historic Places Trust Elections Regulations 1993
 Administering the following Acts of Parliament:
 Broadcasting Act 1989 
 Television New Zealand Act 2003
 Protected Objects Act 1975
 Historic Places Act 1993
 National War Memorial Act 1992
 Radio New Zealand Act 1995
 Anzac Day Act 1966
 New Zealand Film Commission Act 1978
 Flags, Emblems, and Names Protection Act 1981
 Archives, Culture, and Heritage Reform Act 2000
 Museum of New Zealand Te Papa Tongarewa Act 1992
 Arts Council of New Zealand Toi Aotearoa Act 1994
 New Zealand Film Commission Act 1978
 Consultation responsibilities under many acts relating the Treaty of Waitangi settlements.
Port Nicholson Block (Taranaki Whānui ki Te Upoko o Te Ika) Claims Settlement Act 2009
Ngaa Rauru Kiitahi Claims Settlement Act 2005

Ministers 
The ministry serves three portfolios, three ministers and two associate ministers.

References

External links

New Zealand History Online

New Zealand Public Service departments
Arts in New Zealand
Cultural heritage of New Zealand